The Indiana University School of Education (abbreviated as IU School of Education) is a constituent school of Indiana University Bloomington and one of the top-ranked schools of education in the United States. It offers a range of degrees in professional education: a B.S. in teacher education, leading to a teaching license, M.S., education specialist (Ed.S.) and doctoral (Ed.D., Ph.D.) degrees.

Academics
There are 4 departments in the IU School of Education:
Counseling and Educational Psychology
Curriculum and Instruction
Educational Leadership and Policy Studies
Instructional Systems Technology

Research Centers 
There are 3 research centers at the IU School of Education:

 Center for Evaluation and Education Policy (CEEP)
 Center for Postsecondary Research (CPR)
 Center for Research on Learning and Technology (CRLT)

Since 2014, the Center for Postsecondary Research has been responsible for the maintenance and production of the Carnegie Classification of Institutions of Higher Education, the largest and most prominent framework for classifying colleges and universities in the United States. Created in 1970, it is named after and was originally created by the Carnegie Foundation for the Advancement of Teaching.

History
In May 1923 the School of Education became autonomous from the College of Arts and Sciences. In 1925 the first B.S. in education was granted; in 1929 the first M.S., and in 1932 the first Ed.D. The Ph.D. with a major in education has been awarded through the University Graduate School since 1924.

In 1951, the School of Education moved into a three-story limestone building. In the 1960s and 1970s, the Indiana University School of Education grew to become one of the largest schools of education in the United States. In 1992, the School of Education in Bloomington moved into a new W. W. Wright Education Building.

Accreditations and rankings
IU's School of Education  counts some of the country's leading scholars and educational leaders among its faculty and alumni, including former US Secretary of Education Rod Paige. It has been accredited by the National Council for Accreditation of Teacher Education
(NCATE) since the foundation of NCATE in 1954. The School of Education houses masters degree programs in Mental Health Counseling and School Counseling, both of which are accredited by the Masters in Psychology and Counseling Accreditation Council (MPCAC).

U.S. News & World Report have consistently placed the school among the top graduate schools of education in the United States since the rankings began in 1987.

References

External links
 Official Site

Indiana University
Schools of education in Indiana
Educational institutions established in 1923
1923 establishments in Indiana